Shara Hubrich (born 15 September 1997) is a German karateka. She won the silver medal in the women's 50 kg event at the 2021 World Karate Championships held in Dubai, United Arab Emirates. In May 2021, she won the silver medal in the women's 50 kg event at the European Karate Championships held in Poreč, Croatia. She also won the gold medal in the women's team kumite event.

Career 

She competed in the women's 50 kg event at the 2018 World Karate Championships held in Madrid, Spain. She won one of the bronze medals in the women's team kumite event at the 2019 European Karate Championships in Guadalajara, Spain. A month later, she competed in the women's kumite 50 kg event at the 2019 European Games held in Minsk, Belarus.

She competed in the women's 50 kg event at the 2022 European Karate Championships held in Gaziantep, Turkey. She competed in the women's 50 kg at the 2022 World Games held in Birmingham, United States.

Achievements

References

External links 

 

Living people
1997 births
Place of birth missing (living people)
German female karateka
Karateka at the 2019 European Games
European Games competitors for Germany
Competitors at the 2022 World Games
21st-century German women